E Green & Sons (Castings) Ltd v ASTMS [1984] IRLR 135 (EAT) is a UK labour law case, concerning the information and consultation in the European Union.

Facts
Three subsidiary companies of the ‘Green Economisers Group plc’ operated from the same premises. EG&S (Castings) Ltd sacked 97 employees. Green & Son sacked 36 employees. EG&S (Site Services) Ltd sacked 24 employees. All this happened without consultation. They all shared accounting services, and the personnel director of the holding company was responsible for all the subsidiaries. The managing director was responsible for the decision to make redundancies in each. The workers claimed that more than 100 people were dismissed by the same employer at one establishment, to get longer consultation. 
Tribunal held that the employees were dismissed from the same ‘establishment’ within the meaning of EPA 1975 s 99. The companies applied for review on the ground that all employees signed separate contracts with the companies, which were different ‘employers’, under the Act.

Judgment
Nolan J held that the corporate veil cannot be lifted. This was three separate employers. One establishment does not mean one premises and business. Employment is between the subsidiary and the employee, because the relationship is determined by the contract of employment. No further inquiry is necessary.

See also

UK labour law
Codetermination
DHN Ltd v Tower Hamlets LBC

Notes

References
National and Local Government Officers Association v National Travel (Midlands) Ltd [1978] ICR 598 Kilner-Brown J declined to treat a group as one, because a subsidiary, it was found, was not ‘bound hand and foot’ 
Harold Holdsworth & Co (Wakefield) Ltd v Caddies [1955] 1 WLR 352, 367, Lord Reid, asking whether the actions of the subsidiary are no more than a formality, because the parent has effective control of the subsidiary’s internal management.

United Kingdom labour case law